David Abram Antin (February 1, 1932 – October 11, 2016) was an American poet, critic and performance artist.

Education and early career 
Antin was born in New York City in 1932. After graduating from Brooklyn Technical High School, he earned his B.A. from City College of New York in 1955 and his M.A. from New York University in 1966. He spent the first ten years of his career (1955-1964) as a translator of both scientific texts and fiction, including multiple scientific text translations (typically German to English) for Pergamon Press where he interacted frequently with the company's flamboyant founder, British publishing tycoon Robert Maxwell. By the late 1950s Antin had begun to experiment with writing fiction and poetry, with his first published work appearing in the Kenyon Review in 1959. By the early 1960s, Antin had developed significantly, both as a poet and as an art critic, and it has been said that his articles about Andy Warhol and Robert Morris (in 1965) were among the first truly analytical writings about either artist.

Works
In the late 1960s, Antin began performing extemporaneously, improvising "talk poems" at readings and exhibitions. In the late 1960s Antin moved with his wife, the writer and performance artist Eleanor Antin, to Southern California to take up a post at the University of California, San Diego, in the newly formed and experimental Visual Arts Department. He served for a time as gallery director and from 1971 to 1999 as a Professor. During this time Antin served several terms as Chairman of the Visual Arts Dept. In the early 1970s, his influence on a nascent group of conceptual photographers among the graduate students there was powerful. He has a fellowship in the Guggenheim Foundation and the NEH. He also received the PEN Los Angeles Award for Poetry in 1984.  In 2008, Antin was a featured performer at the &NOW Festival at Chapman University.

Antin said that as a child he wanted to invent things, and that to him this meant he must either become a scientist or an artist. His early published poetry, collected in Selected Poems: 1963-1973, was experimental, using found or "readymade" texts to address issues of language. In "Definitions for Mendy," a poem from this book, he uses definitions of "loss" from both a dictionary and an insurance handbook to fuel a meditation on the death of a friend. In his "Novel Poems" from the same book, he pages through popular novels, choosing a line or a phrase from each page to assemble poems.

After gathering some experience reading his poems, he began to find the convention of reading his own previously written poetry stultifying. He turned instead to improvising poems that are a kind of thinking out loud about the act of creating meaning. The themes of these "talk pieces" are often inspired by their location and audience. The talk pieces can be viewed alternately as poetry that seeks to re-connect with oral and performative aspects of the poetic tradition, as philosophy in the tradition of Plato's dialogues or Wittgenstein's lectures, or as a "site-specific" artwork like Robert Smithson's earthworks. He tape-records each performance and often composes subsequent written versions, which are collected in books like "talking at the boundaries," "tuning" and "what it means to be avant garde."

In his talk pieces Antin blends personal narrative with philosophical reflection to address issues of meaning. In "tuning," for example, he critiques the concept of "understanding" and offers an alternative model. In "what it means to be avant garde" he suggests that the avant garde attempts to address not the future but the present. In "the fringe" he tells a story about resistance to the Vietnam War that offers as a central figure a bucket containing the urine of several Guggenheim poets.

Selected works
Definitions Caterpillar Press, New York, 1967. Poetry
Autobiography, Something Else Press, A Great Bear Pamphlet, New York, 1967. See: UbuWeb edition 2004
Code of Flag Behavior, Black Sparrow Press, Los Angeles, 1968. Poetry
Meditations, Black Sparrow Press, Los Angeles, 1971. Poetry
After the War; A Long Novel with Few Words, Black Sparrow Press, Santa Barbara, 1973
Talking, Kulchur Foundation, 1972. New edition: 2001. Poetry
Talking at the Boundaries, New Directions, New York,  1976
Tuning, New Directions, New York, 1984
Selected Poems: 1963-1973, Sun & Moon, Los Angeles, 1991.
What It Means to Be Avant-Garde, New Directions, New York, 1993.
A Conversation with David Antin (with Charles Bernstein) 2001
i never knew what time it was, University of California Press, Berkeley,  2005.
john cage uncaged is still cagey 2006
Radical Coherency: Selected Essays on Art and Literature, 1966 to 2005, University of Chicago Press, 2010.

References

External links
David Antin at UbuWeb Includes PDF edition of Autobiography and full text of In Place of a Lecture: Three Musics for Two Voices from Talking
David Antin at Electronic Poetry Center Includes excerpts from books, interviews, and sound recordings
David Antin at Design Observer A short piece on the history of Antin's some/thing journal (coedited with Jerome Rothenberg) and its BOMB HANOI cover, produced by Andy Warhol
 David Antin papers, 1954-2006. The Getty Research Institute, Los Angeles, Accession No. 2008.M.56. The papers of performance artist, experimental poet, curator, and critic David Antin include extensive correspondence, forty years of diaries, published and unpublished manuscripts, working notes, teaching files, and over 300 audiotapes and videos of lectures and performances.

1932 births
2016 deaths
Writers from New York (state)
Jewish American poets
Jewish American artists
University of California, San Diego faculty
New York University alumni
Brooklyn Technical High School alumni
City College of New York alumni
21st-century American Jews